Een Vreemde Liefde  is a 1990 Dutch film made for television directed by Edwin de Vries.

Cast
Gerard Thoolen		
Huub van der Lubbe		
Frans Vorstman		
Olga Zuiderhoek

External links 
 

Dutch drama films
1990 films
1990s Dutch-language films